Merle Spellerberg (born 13 November 1996) is a German politician of the Alliance 90/The Greens who has been serving as a member of the Bundestag since the 2021 German federal election, representing the Dresden II – Bautzen II district.

Early life and education 
Spellerberg attended the König-Wilhelm-Gymnasium Höxter, where she received her Abitur in 2016. She studied at the TU Dresden.

Political career 
In parliament, Spellerberg has been serving on the Committee on Foreign Affairs, the Defence Committee and the Subcommittee on Disarmament, Arms Control and Non-Proliferation.

In addition to her committee assignments, Spellerberg has been an alternate member of the German delegation to the Parliamentary Assembly of the Council of Europe (PACE) since 2022. In the Assembly, she serves on the Committee on Equality and Non-Discrimination and the Sub-Committee on Gender Equality. She has also been a member of the German delegation to the NATO Parliamentary Assembly, where she is part of the Defence and Security Committee and the Political Committee.

Other activities 
 Federal Academy for Security Policy (BAKS), Member of the Advisory Board (since 2022)

References

External links 
 

Living people
1996 births
People from Höxter
21st-century German politicians
21st-century German women politicians
Members of the Bundestag for Alliance 90/The Greens
Members of the Bundestag 2021–2025
Female members of the Bundestag